Belalcázar is a municipality and city in the province of Córdoba, Andalusia, southern Spain. Belalcázar s located approximately 100 km from Córdoba city. 

Belalcázar is well-known by its cultural heritage: two castles, the convent of Santa Clara, the church of Santiago, the Roman bridge, or the city hall among others.

Main sights
Castle of the Sotomayor Zúñiga y Madroñiz, in late Gothic style (15th century)
Castle of Madroñiz
Convent of Santa Clara de la Columna, founded in 1476 
Parish church of Santiago el Mayor, built from the late 16th century and finished in the 18th century.

Gallery

Twin towns
 Belalcázar, Colombia

References

External links
Belalcázar - Sistema de Información Multiterritorial de Andalucía

Municipalities in the Province of Córdoba (Spain)